Xingtan is a town, part of Shunde district, in Foshan prefecture-level city, Guangdong Province, southern China.

See also
 Fengjian Village

Shunde District
Towns in Guangdong